Jean-Marc Ithier (born 15 July 1965 in Rodrigues) is a retired Mauritian footballer. Besides Mauritius, he has played in South Africa.

Career
Ithier joined South Africa Premier Soccer League club Engen Santos from the Mauritian club Sunrise Flacq United in 1999, and played for the People's Team until his retirement in 2006. With approximately 70 goals, he is also the club's all-time leading goal-scorer.

Ithier was appointed Engen Santos' caretaker coach after the departure of head coach Roger De Sa, who joined Bidvest Wits after the 06/07 season but was later replaced by David Bright of Botswana. Ithier became an assistant to the club's current head coach, Boebie Solomons. In 2011, Ithier left the club to venture into his own project after deciding to open a football academy that will help develop young talented footballers.

Ithier also previously coached the South African Homeless World Cup squad.

Career statistics

International goals

References

External links

1965 births
Living people
Mauritian footballers
Mauritius international footballers
Mauritian expatriate footballers
Association football forwards
People from Rodrigues
Santos F.C. (South Africa) players
Expatriate soccer players in South Africa
Mauritian expatriate sportspeople in South Africa
Mauritian football managers